As a highly venerated saint in both the Western and Eastern Christian churches, Saint George is connected with a large number of patronages throughout the world, and his iconography can be found on the flags and coats of arms of a number of cities, regions, and countries.

National saint

Georgia

Saint George is a patron saint of Georgia, and it is claimed by Georgian author Enriko Gabisashvili that Saint George is most venerated in that nation. An 18th-century Georgian geographer and historian Vakhushti Bagrationi wrote that there are 365 Orthodox churches in Georgia named after Saint George, according to the number of days in one year. There are indeed many churches in Georgia named after the Saint; Alaverdi Monastery is one of the largest.

Devotions to the saint in Georgia date back to the 4th century. While not technically named after the saint (Sakartvelo is the Georgian name for the country), its English name is an early and well-attested back-derivation of Saint George. The terms Georgia and Georgians appeared in Western Europe in numerous early medieval annals. The French chronicler Jacques de Vitry and the English traveler Sir John Mandeville wrote that Georgians are called Georgian because they especially revere Saint George.

The Georgian Orthodox Church commemorates St. George's day twice a year, on 6 May (O.C. 23 April) and 23 November. The feast day in November was instituted by St Nino of Cappadocia, who was credited with bringing Christianity to the land of Georgia in the 4th century. She was from Cappadocia, like Saint George, and was said to be his relative. This feast day is unique to Georgia, and it is the day of St George's martyrdom.

There are also many folk traditions in Georgia that vary from Georgian Orthodox Church rules, because they portray the Saint differently from the Church, and show the veneration of Saint George by the common people of Georgia. Different regions of Georgia have different traditions, and in most folk tales Saint George is venerated very highly, almost as much as Jesus himself. In the province of Kakheti, there is an icon of St George known as White George. This image is also seen on the current Coat of Arms of Georgia. The region of Pshavi has icons known as the Cuppola St. George and Lashari St. George. The Khevsureti region has Kakhmati, Gudani, and Sanebi icons dedicated to the Saint. The Pshavs and Khevsurs during the Middle Ages used to refer to Saint George almost as much as praying to God and the Blessed Virgin Mary. Another notable icon is known as the Lomisi Saint George, which can be found in the Mtiuleti and Khevi provinces of Georgia.

An example of a folk tale about St. George is given by author Enriko Gabidzashvili:

გიორგი (giorgi), the Georgian variant of name George, is historically the most popular given name for men in Georgia.

England

Traces of the cult of St George predate the Norman Conquest, in 9th-century liturgy used at Durham Cathedral, in a 10th-century Anglo-Saxon martyrology, and in dedications to Saint George at Fordington, Dorset, at Thetford, Norfolk and Doncaster. He received further impetus when the Crusaders returned from the Holy Land in the 12th century. At the Battle of Antioch in 1098, St George, St Demetrius and St Maurice were said to have been seen riding alongside the crusaders, and depictions of this event can be seen in a number of churches. King Edward III (reigned 1327–77) was known for promoting the codes of knighthood and in 1348 founded the Order of the Garter.  During Edward's reign, George came to be recognised as the patron saint of the English monarchy; before this, Saint Edmund had been considered the patron saint of England, although his veneration had waned since the time of the Norman conquest, and his cult was partly eclipsed by that of Edward the Confessor. Edward dedicated the chapel at Windsor Castle to the soldier saint who represented the knightly values of chivalry which he so much admired, and the Garter ceremony takes place there every year. In the 16th century, Edmund Spenser included St. George (Redcross Knight) as a central figure in his epic poem The Faerie Queene. William Shakespeare firmly placed St George within the national conscience in his play Henry V, in which the English troops are rallied with the cry "God for Harry, England and St George," and in Richard III, and King Lear.

A late 17th-century ballad also claims St. George as an English patron. The ballad compares other mythic and historical heroes with the merit of St. George and concludes that all are less important than St. George.

With the revival of Scottish and Welsh nationalism, there has been renewed interest within England in Saint George, whose memory had been in abeyance for many years.  This is most evident in the St George's flags which now have replaced Union Flags in stadiums where English sports teams compete. Above the Palace of Westminster, there are six shields above each of the four clock faces of Big Ben, twenty-four in total, all depicting the arms of St George, representing the Flag of England, London as the capital city of England, and St. George as the patron saint of England. This symbolism is also repeated in the central lobby of the Houses of Parliament, in an enormous mosaic created by Sir Edward John Poynter in 1869, depicting St George and the Dragon with these arms &c, entitled "St George for England".

St George's Day is also celebrated each year in London with a day of celebration run by the Greater London Authority and the London Mayor. The UK Houses of Parliament also celebrate St George's Day each year with a reception and other events, organised by the St. George's Day All Party Parliamentary Group, including providing every MP with a red rose to wear in his/her lapel. 
The Royal Society of St. George, City of London Branch hold a Banquet on St George's Day either in the Guildhall or a London Livery Hall, they also hold a Christmas Banquet at the Mansion House.

The city of Salisbury holds an annual St George's Day pageant, the origins of which are believed to go back to the 13th century.

The Order of St Michael and St George, a British order of chivalry, was founded in 1818, and partly named after the saint.

Iberia

Aragon, Catalonia, Valencia

In Spain, Saint George also came to be considered as the patron saint of the medieval Crown of Aragon, the territory of four current autonomous communities of Spain: Aragon, Catalonia, Valencia and the Balearic Islands. Nowadays Saint George is the patron saint of both Aragon and Catalonia, as well as the patron saint of Barcelona (see Flag of Barcelona) and other historically important Spanish towns such as Cáceres or Alcoi (Spanish language: San Jorge, Catalan language: Sant Jordi, Aragonese language: San Chorche).

His feast date, 23 April, is one of the most important holidays in Catalonia, where it is traditional to give a present to the loved one; red roses for women and books for men. In Aragon it is a public holiday, celebrated as the 'National Day of Aragon'. It is also a public holiday in Castile and Leon, where the day commemorates the defeat at the Revolt of the Comuneros.

Portugal and Brazil

Apparently, the English crusaders who helped King Afonso Henriques (1109–85) in the conquest of Lisbon in 1147 introduced a devotion to Saint George to Portugal. Nevertheless, it was not until the time of King Afonso IV (1291–1357) that the use of São Jorge!! (Saint George) as a battle cry, substituted for the former Sant'Iago!! (Saint James). Nuno Álvares Pereira (1360–1431), Saint Constable of Portugal, considered Saint George the leader of the Portuguese victory in the battle of Aljubarrota. King John I (1357–1433) was also a devotee of the saint and was in his reign that Saint George replaced Saint James as the main patron saint of Portugal. In 1387, he ordered that its image on horse be carried in the Corpus Christi procession.

As part of the Portuguese Empire, Brazil inherited the devotion to Saint George as patron saint of Portugal. In the religious traditions of the Afro-Brazilian Candomblé and Umbanda, Ogum (as this Yoruba divinity is known in the Portuguese language) is often identified with Saint George in many regions of the country, being widely celebrated by both religions' followers. Popular devotion to Saint George is very strong in Rio de Janeiro, where the saint vies in popularity with the city's official patron Saint Sebastian, both saints' feast days being local holidays.

Saint George is also the patron saint of the football club Corinthians, of São Paulo. The club stadium is Parque São Jorge (Saint George's Park).

Russia and Bulgaria

St. George is praised by the Bulgarians as "liberator of captives, and defender of the poor, physician of the sick". For centuries he has been considered by the Bulgarians as their protector. Possibly the most celebrated name day in the country, St George's Day (Гергьовден, Gergyovden) is a public holiday that takes place on 6 May every year. A common ritual is to prepare and eat a whole lamb. St. George is the patron saint of farmers and shepherds.

St. George's Day is also the Day of the Bulgarian Army (made official with a decree of Knyaz Alexander of Bulgaria on 9 January 1880), and parades are organised in the capital Sofia to present the best of the army's equipment and manpower.

In Russia, the cult of Saint George arrived in the 11th century during the reign of Yaroslav the Wise (1010–19). The earliest icon of Saint George is at Staraya Ladoga, in a church dedicated to him, dating from the 12th century. The cult, as in Lithuania, displaced that of a pagan deity, the sun god Dazhbog, which involved shepherds bringing their flocks to pastures. Saint George was Yaroslav's patron saint, and also that of his descendant Yuri Dolgorukiy (reigned 1149–51 and 1155–57), who founded what was to become the Russian capital city, Moscow, in 1156 (Yuri is Russian for George). 

The city's coat of arms originally displayed a mounted soldier slaying a dragon. However, it was not until 1730 that Saint George was officially adopted as Moscow's patron saint, and the mounted soldier would be interpreted as Saint George. There are several statues of Saint George and the dragon in Moscow, all of which are recent, owing to the fact that the Russian Orthodox Church forbade sculptural representations of saints, and the Soviets discouraged religious emblems.
The arms of Moscow also appears on the coat of arms of Russia, as a small shield on the breast of the double-headed eagle. Two of Russia's highest decorations are called the Cross of St. George and the Order of St. George.

Bosnia, Montenegro and Serbia

In medieval Bosnia, Saint George, or Gregory, the Miracle-worker, spread through the rise of the new territorial church, the schismatic Bosnian Church, after the Catholic episcopal see had to move out from Bosnia to Đakovo, in the first half of the 13th century. This prompted Bosnians to search for a new confessional identity, so in a fully autonomous act, unrecognized by papacy at the time, Bosnian political and ecclesiastical hierarchy turned the saint, also known for his state-building role, into both the ruling Kotromanić dynasty and the state patron. Patronage of Saint George, the Miracle-worker, will eventually get its recognition by Pope Pius II, in late 1461. Meanwhile, the cult of St. Gregory, maintained by the Bosnian Church, will see another manifestation in Gregory of Nazianzus in the first half of the 15th century, which will change to St. Gregory with King Thomas' conversion to Catholicism in late 1440s early 1450s. On 26 August 1752 papacy confirmed St. Elijah as the patron saint of the Bosnian Kingdom, on the request of bishop fra Pavao Dragićević, which will be celebrated along with Saint George as patrons of Bosnia and Herzegovina to this day.

"Đurđevdan" ( – George's day) is a Serbian religious holiday, celebrated on 23 April by the Julian calendar (6 May by Gregorian calendar), which is the feast of Saint George and a very important Slava.  Đurđevdan is celebrated all over the Serbian diaspora but mainly in Serbia, Montenegro and Bosnia and Herzegovina. 
In the Serbian language, St. George is called Sveti Đorđe (Serbian Cyrillic: Свети Ђорђе).

Churches and monasteries

Eastern Christianity
 
Saint George is the patron saint of Lebanese Christians, Palestinian Christians, and Syrian Christians.

The 16th-century monastery known as the Monastery of Saint George is near al-Khader, Palestine. In the Wadi Qelt near Jericho stands the St. George's Monastery.

Saint George is among the most celebrated saints in Syria, especially among the Antiochian churches. The historical Saint George's Monastery in Meshtaye village near the city of Homs is a Greek Orthodox religious complex dating back to the 5th century. It consists of three leveled churches from the 5th, 13th and the 19th centuries respectively. The oldest one is entirely built in Byzantine style. The monastery is one of the most busiest destinations for local and foreign pilgrims, mainly at the feast of Saint George and the feast of the elevation of the Holy Cross (14 September).

At Mughni (Armenia), there is a monastery dedicated to Saint George, in Armenian Սուրբ  Գեւորգ (Surb Gevork). First mentioned in 1278, the monastery is said to contain relics of the saint.

The Church of Saint George in Lalibela, Ethiopia dates to around 1200 AD.  The church is dedicated to the saint, and is one of eleven monolithic churches in Lalibela, a holy city in Ethiopia and a site of pilgrimage.   St. George's Cathedral in Addis Ababa is also dedicated to the saint, and the city's main football club is Saint George S.C.  A local beer is named after the saint.

In Greece, there is a monastery on the island of Skyros devoted to the saint.

One of Montenegro's islands is called Sveti Đorđe (Serbian Cyrillic: Свети Ђорђе), where there is a monastery devoted to the saint.

Western Christianity

Abbot Hatto (888–913) of the Monastic Island of Reichenau had a St George's Church erected, after he had received relics from the hands of Pope Formosus. The later Archbishop of Mainz made a major contribution to spread the veneration of Saint George throughout East Francia. The Georgslied, a set of poems and hymns to Saint George in Old High German was composed on Reichenau island and the scholar Hermann of Reichenau wrote a Historia sancti Georgii in the mid-11th century, which today is lost.
About 1056 Archbishop Anno II of Cologne had the St George's Basilica erected, one of the twelve Romanesque churches of Cologne. About 30 years later, former Vogts of Reichenau Abbey established the St. George's Abbey in the Black Forest. Saint George was also a patron saint of the Teutonic Knights, the State of the Teutonic Order and present-day Lithuania. Emperor Maximilian I (1493–1519), the "Last Knight", chose Saint George his personal tutelar.

Notable Italian churches named for the saint are in the Province of Ragusa, in the southern part of Sicily, in the cities of Modica (whose patron is St. George) and in Ragusa. Both of them are in the World Heritage List by UNESCO.

Kerala
One of the main pilgrimages of St. George in Kerala is at Edappally (Ernakulam District), where the feast is celebrated on 4 May. Edathwa also attracts thousands of pilgrims. Angamaly Basilica is named after St. George. All these three churches are Catholic churches belonging to Syro-Malabar rite. In all Christian families in India, especially Kerala, the name George or Varghese is very popular.
There are numerous churches dedicated to Saint George in India, especially in Kerala, practicing Oriental Orthodoxy, and shrines to the saint. On the banks of the Kodoor River in the district of Kottayam in Kerala, the village of Puthupally is known for its 16th-century St. George Orthodox Syrian Church. The feast of this church, held on May 6 and May 7,  attracts pilgrims from all over Kerala. It is one of the largest pilgrim centers of Saint George in India, where they celebrate his feast on the first Saturday and Sunday in May.

A Roman Catholic church dedicated to Saint George in Puthiyathura, Thiruvananthapuram district of Kerala, is also a pilgrim centre with an annual St George's Day celebration. In Tamil Nadu, Kanyakumari district, Nagercoil Town, Thalavaipuram—a famous church for St George and the people of the town—celebrates the feast of St George for ten days from the second Friday of May every year. There is also a Roman Catholic church in Aleppey, Edathua, visited by pilgrims from Tamil Nadu and Karnataka.

Cities

Eastern Christianity

Saint George is the patron saint of Beirut, Lebanon. Many bays around Lebanon are named after Saint George, particularly the Saint George Bay, at the mouth of the Beirut River, as local tradition identifies it as the site where he killed the dragon.
In Lebanon, Saint George is believed to have cleaned off his spear at a massive rocky cave running into the hillside and overlooking the Jounieh Bay. Others argue it is at the Bay of Tabarja. The waters of both caves are believed to have miraculous powers for healing ailing children.  A gilded icon of St. George is kept in the Greek Orthodox Cathedral in Beirut.

Saint George is a patron of the Podgorica, the capital of Montenegro. As in Serbia, his day, known in the local language as Đurđevdan ( – George's day), is an important religious holiday. It is held on 23 April in the Julian calendar, corresponding to 6 May in the Gregorian calendar.

Saint George (Greek: Άγιος Γεώργιος) is a particularly loved and venerated Saint in Greece. He is the patron Saint of the Hellenic Army and Infantry, as well as the patron Saint of numerous Greek cities, towns and villages including Arachova, Eratyra, Goumenissa, Ierapetra, Nemea, Nigrita, Sidirokastro, Soufli, Vevi, etc., and the island of Skyros.

Western Christianity
In Mons (Belgium), Saint George is honoured each year on Trinity Sunday. In the heart of the city, a reconstitution (known as the "Combat dit Lumeçon") of the fight between Saint George and the dragon is played by 46 actors. According to the tradition, the inhabitants of Mons try to get a piece of the dragon during the fight. This will bring luck for one year to the ones succeeding in this challenge. This event is part of the annual Ducasse festival and is attended by thousands of people.

Saint George (Sint Joris) is the patron saint of the city Amersfoort in The Netherlands. It also appears on its coat of arms (Stadswapen).
 
Saint George is the patron saint of the German city of Freiburg im Breisgau. He also appears on the coats of arms of several German towns and cities, including Bamberg, Bürgel, Dießen am Ammersee, Eisenach, Mengeringhausen, Schwarzenberg, and, of course, Sankt Georgen im Schwarzwald.

In Chennai, India, Saint George was made the patron saint of the city when Fort St. George was built, which was finished on Saint George's day. The English decided to name the fort after Saint George, who became the city's patron saint.

In Italy, Saint George is one of the Patron Saints of Genoa, Milan and Bologna as well as the patron saint of Ferrara, Reggio Calabria, Cellatica in Brescia, Sassuolo and Locorotondo.
Saint George is also the patron saint of San Giorgio di Mantova (near Mantua)
and San Giorgio La Molara (near Benevento).
The historical bank that was the backbone of the Republic of Genoa, "Repubblica Marinara di Genova", was dedicated to St George, "Banco di San Giorgio". The power of the Repubblica passing from commerce to banking,  Genoa lent money to all the European countries and sovereigns, so the power of the "Repubblica" was identified with its patron saint.

Two parishes are dedicated to Saint George in Malta and Gozo, the Parish of Qormi, Malta and the Parish of Victoria, Gozo.  Besides being the patron of Victoria where a St. George's Basilica, Malta is dedicated to him, St George is the protector of the island Gozo.

In Lithuania, Saint George is the second most important patron saint, after Saint Casimir. His cult spread throughout Lithuania in the 15th century as a compromise to the former rituals to the pagan spring god Pergrubis, owing to the fact that his feast day in mainly Roman Catholic Lithuania, as in the rest of the Western Church, falls on 23 April. For most of Lithuania's modern history, the day was celebrated by farmers with offerings of animals in churches and the baking of special bread.
Today several Lithuanian towns, including Marijampolė, Prienai and Varniai, display Saint George on their coats of arms.

Topical patronages

Scouting

St George's Day is also celebrated with parades in those countries of which he is the patron saint. Also, St George is the patron saint of Scouting. On St George's Day (or the closest Sunday), Scouts in some countries choose to take part in a parade and some kind of church service in which they renew their Scout Promise.  In the United States, both the Episcopal Church and the Catholic Church (in both the Roman Rite and in Eastern Rites) offer a Saint George Award to adults; the Baden-Powell Scouts' Association holds St. George's Scout as their highest youth award; Orthodox Churches offer a Saint George Award to both Cub Scouts and Brownie Girl Scouts.
St George is the patron saint of the Boy Scouts of America.  As with many other NATO countries, St. George is the patron saint of the U.S. Army's Armor Branch.

Military

 Patron saint of cavalry and armour branches in most Christian nations´ armed forces.
 Patron saint of soldiers and "all people protecting the nation"
 Patron saint of Greece and Cyprus armed forces.
 Specific military units, such as the United States Cavalry and United States Armor Association
 The United States Armor Association awards the Saint George Award to tankers and cavalry troopers in a knighting ceremony.

Syphilis
He is also the patron saint of skin disease sufferers and syphilitic people.

Miscellaneous
Several United Nations (UN) peacekeepers also celebrated Saint George's Day during their peacekeeping missions in conflict-stricken countries.

See also
 Saint George paintings gallery
 Saint George's church gallery.

References

Catholic devotions
Saint George (martyr)